Mahou is a Spanish brand of beers brewed by the Mahou-San Miguel Group. The brand portfolio contains a variety of beers including non-alcoholic and mixed varieties. The Mahou brewery was founded in Madrid in 1890.

In November 2000, Mahou and the other major Spanish brewery San Miguel merged to form the Mahou-San Miguel group.

Range of beers 

 Classic Mahou
 Mahou 5 estrellas (Mahou 5 Stars)
 Mahou Sin
 Mahou Negra
 Mahou Mixta
 Mahou Radler

References

External links 

 Product portfolio on mahou.com

Beer in Spain
Manufacturing companies based in Madrid
Food and drink companies established in 1890
1890 establishments in Spain
Spanish brands